Admiral Hayes may refer to:

John B. Hayes (1924–2001), U.S. Coast Guard admiral
John Daniel Hayes (1902–1991), U.S. Navy rear admiral
John Hayes (Royal Navy officer)  (1767 or 1775–1838), British Royal Navy rear admiral
John Osler Chattock Hayes (1913–1998), British Royal Navy vice admiral

See also
Arthur Hayes-Sadler (1865–1952), British Royal Navy admiral
Ronald J. Hays (1928–2021), U.S. Navy admiral
Lord John Hay (Royal Navy officer, born 1793) (1793–1851), British Royal Navy rear admiral
Lord John Hay (Royal Navy officer, born 1827) (1827–1916), British Royal Navy admiral